Florida Township may refer to the following townships in the United States:

 Florida Township, Parke County, Indiana
 Florida Township, Yellow Medicine County, Minnesota
 Florida Township, Michigan, former name of Jefferson Township, Hillsdale County, Michigan